Platypus Man is an American sitcom that aired on UPN from January 23 to May 15, 1995, during the network's first season. Starring comedian Richard Jeni, the television series was based on an hour-long HBO special of Jeni's filmed in 1992. The series lasted one season, with a total of thirteen episodes.

Platypus Man premiered January 23, 1995. The concept of a "Platypus Man" (a solitary male, like the male platypus), the concept of a "cooking show for guys" and the scenes involving the main character's social life were drawn from Jeni's stand-up routines.

The show, paired with Pig Sty, followed Star Trek: Voyager on UPN's Monday schedule. Both Pig Sty and Platypus Man were canceled in July 1995.

Origin
In the early 1990s, Jeni developed a comedy routine where he watched a National Geographic special on the platypus. In the routine, Jeni went on to describe how he found himself relating to the TV show, and the concept of a "platypus man" was expanded to become the theme behind Jeni's 1992 HBO comedy special.

The HBO special was taped in 1992 at the Park West Theater in Chicago, Illinois and covered topics such as news ("the bad news"), sports (including Jeni's "NFL Football Referee" routine), politics, music and sex. Executive producers on the project were Richard Jeni and Michael Rotenberg, it was produced by Tom Bull and Sandy Chandley, and post-production was handled by Steve Sharp and Juniper Recording Studios.

The set design for the special was created by Norm Dodge and included a checkered tile floor, a backdrop with painted-on palm trees, a refrigerator and microwave at one end of the stage (provided by Aronson Furniture, for a comedic bit entitled "Bill the Belching Gourmet"), and a black sofa at the other end of the stage. This design was reproduced in clay for the opening sequence of Platypus Man, in which art director Rick Toone of D&K Group/Claymagic used the process of claymation to introduce the show with the help of a duck-billed clay version of Richard Jeni and footage from the platypus exhibit at Taronga Zoo in Sydney.

The live-action portions of the opening sequence were shot inside and outside of Jeni's house in the Hollywood Hills (in the bedroom, bathroom, hallway, driveway, balcony and pool area) and on the streets of West Hollywood, California. The song "Platypus Man" that opened and closed the special was created with the combined efforts of Scott May, Richard Jeni, and fellow comedian Rondell Sheridan and sung in a blues-like voice by Jeni.

Synopsis
In the series, Jeni played himself and was host of a cooking show called Cooking with the Platypus Man. Ron Orbach played Lou, executive producer of his cooking show and his best friend since childhood. Denise Miller played Paige, his sportswriter neighbor. David Dundara played Tommy, his bartending younger brother.

Cast
 Richard Jeni as himself
 David Dundara as Tommy Jeni
 Denise Miller as Paige McAllister
 Ron Orbach as Lou Golembiewski

Episodes

References

External links

 
About Platypus Man

1990s American sitcoms
1995 American television series debuts
1995 American television series endings
English-language television shows
UPN original programming
Fictional monotremes
Television series about mammals
Television series by CBS Studios
Television shows set in New York City
Latino sitcoms